Thymopsis nilenta is a species of lobster and the only species in the genus Thymopsis. It is known from a total of four specimens collected from two localities.

References

True lobsters
Crustaceans of the Atlantic Ocean
Crustaceans described in 1974